The 2013 National People's Congress (formally, the 1st Session of the 12th National People's Congress) held its annual meeting in March 2013 at the Great Hall of the People in Beijing, China. The session opened 5 March and concluded on 16 March, 2013 This was the Session in which major state positions were elected.

Government Work Report
Below are the key points of the country's achievements in the past five years, from Premier Wen Jiabao's work report:
Effectively countered the severe impact of the financial crisis of 2007–2008 and maintained steady and fast economic development.
China's GDP increased from 26.6 trillion yuan to 51.9 trillion yuan, and now ranks second in the world.
Government revenue went up from 5.1 trillion yuan to 11.7 trillion yuan.
A total of 58.7 million urban jobs were created.
The per capita disposable income of urban residents rose by an annual average of 8.8%, and the per capita net income of rural residents rose by 9.9%.
Rice production in China increased for the ninth consecutive year in 2012.
Progress was made in key areas of reform; and the open economy reached a new stage of development.
Made China more innovative. Breakthroughs were made in developing human spaceflight and the lunar exploration program, building a manned deep-sea submersible, launching the Beidou Navigation Satellite System, developing supercomputers and building high-speed railways. China's first aircraft carrier, the Liaoning, was commissioned.
Successfully hosted the Games of the XXIX Olympiad and the XIII Paralympic Games in Beijing and the World Expo in Shanghai.
Successfully mitigated the impact of the massive Wenchuan earthquake, the strong Yushu earthquake, the huge Zhugqu mudslide and other natural disasters and carried out post-disaster recovery and reconstruction.
China's productive forces and overall national strength, its living standards and social security, and its international status and influence all improved significantly.
Successfully completed the Eleventh Five-Year Plan and got off to a good start in implementing the Twelfth Five-Year Plan.
Made significant socialist economic, political, cultural, social, and ecological progress, and wrote a new chapter in building socialism with Chinese characteristics

Events
Hangzhou mayor Shao Zhanwei died during the congress.

References

External links
NPC Official Website

National People's Congresses